Dave Jokerst is a retired American soccer goalkeeper who played in the North American Soccer League.

External links
 NASL stats
 NASL indoor stats

1948 births
Living people
American soccer players
American expatriate soccer players
Association football goalkeepers
California Surf players
North American Soccer League (1968–1984) indoor players
North American Soccer League (1968–1984) players
St. Louis Stars (soccer) players
Soccer players from St. Louis